João Roberto Marinho (Rio de Janeiro, September 16, 1953) is a Brazilian businessman, chairman of the Editorial Board and vice president of the Globo Organizations. He is the third of four children of the deceased Brazilian tycoon Roberto Marinho (3 December 1904 – 6 August 2003).

Career
João Roberto began his career as a journalist for the newspaper "O Globo". In the mid-1990s the Globo Organizations moved its command to the three sons of Roberto Marinho.
According to Forbes 2015 World Billionaire's list, Marinho was placed at number 165 with an estimated net worth of $8.2 billion.

Grupo Globo
Marinho is vice-chairman of the board of directors, Chairman of the Editorial Board, Chairman of Grupo Globo Institutional Committee, and vice-chairman of the National Newspaper Association.

Equestrianism
João Roberto is an amateur rider and was Brazilian champion by teams in 2010 (range of 1.20 m) mounting Haria.

See also
 List of Brazilians by net worth

References

External links 
 João Roberto Marinho: A melhor mídia ainda é o papel 
 Carlos Slim Meets With Latin America's Richest In Brazil
 Grupo Globo Website

1953 births
Living people
Brazilian billionaires
Brazilian people of Italian descent
Businesspeople from Rio de Janeiro (city)
Joao Roberto